The Moscow Mathematical Society (MMS) is a society of Moscow mathematicians aimed at the development of mathematics in Russia. It was created in 1864, and Victor Vassiliev is the current president.

History 

Nikolai Brashman was the first president of MMO.

The Moscow Mathematical Society was first created in 1810 by extended members of the Muraviev family, but it closed down the year after. In the early 1860s, Nikolai Brashman and August Davidov relaunched the Moscow Mathematical Society at the Moscow University and organized its first meeting on 15 September 1864. The stated goal was «mutual cooperation in the study of the mathematical sciences».

Nikolai Brashman was president, and August Davidov vice-president. 14 members joined the Society, with Pafnuty Chebyshev among them. Each member was in charge of a research project, and the bunch met monthly to share and progress on their projects. The outcome was so valuable that the Society decided in April 1865 to publish its works. The first edition of the journal Matematicheskii Sbornik edited by the Society was released in October 1866.

By 1913, the Moscow Mathematical Society had 112 members. The publication of the Matematicheskii Sbornik ceased from 1919 to 1924.

Former presidents 
 Nikolai Brashman (1864–1866)
 August Davidov (1866–1886)
 Vasily Jakovlevich Zinger (1886–1891)
 Nikolai Bugaev (1891–1903)
 Pavel Alekseevich Nekrasov (1903–1905)
 Nikolai Zhukovsky (1905–1921)
 Boleslav Mlodzeevskii (1921–1923)
 Dmitri Egorov (1923–1930)
 Ernst Kolman (1930–1932)
 Pavel Alexandrov (1932–1964)
 Andrey Kolmogorov (1964–1966, 1973–1985)
 Israel Gelfand (1966–1970)
 Igor Shafarevich (1970–1973)
 Sergei Novikov (1985–1996)
 Vladimir Arnold (1996–2010)

Annual Prize 

Every year, the Moscow Mathematical Society awards a young mathematician for his/her outstanding work in the field.

 1951 : Evgenii Landis
 1956 : Friedrich Karpelevich
 1967 : Anatoly Stepin
 1986 : Victor Vassiliev
 2013 : Eugene Gorsky
 2015 : Leonid Petrov

See also
 List of Mathematical Societies
 Matematicheskii Sbornik

References

Further reading 
 Smilka Zdravkovska, Peter Duren (Herausgeber), The golden ages of Moscow Mathematics, American Mathematical Society, 2007
 A.P. Yushkevich, History of mathematics in Russia until 1917, Moscow, 1968

External links 

 Official website

Mathematical societies
Learned societies of Russia
1864 establishments in the Russian Empire
Organizations established in 1864